E. Summers Hardy (1933–2012) was an associate justice of the Oklahoma Supreme Court from 1917 to 1919. He should not be confused with the similarly named justice, Hardy T. Summers, who served on the Oklahoma Court from 1985 to 2003.

Early life and education 
E. Summers Hardy  was born July 15, 1933, in Muskogee, Oklahoma to Cleon Summers, a U. S. Attorney and his wife, Fern (nee Smith) Summers, a surgical nurse. He was raised and received a public school education in Muskogee, then enrolled in Oklahoma University, where he graduated in 1955, with degrees in government and law. While in OU, he joined the Phi Gamma Delta fraternity, and won scholastic honors such as Order of the Coif and Distinguished Air Force ROTC Cadet.

Military duty 
After graduating from OU, Summers entered active duty in the U.S. Air Corps Judge Advocate General Division, where his primary duty was to prosecute and defend court martial cases. A tour of duty at Landstuhl, Germany, offered opportunities to travel in Western Europe and parts of the Near and Middle East. After he was discharged from the service, he returned to Muskogee, where he was first hired as assistant district attorney for Muskogee County, then joined the law firm Fite, Robinson and Summers. In 1963, he married Marilyn Smith, an OU Alumna who was then a reporter for the Muskogee Phoenix.

Civilian life and career 
Oklahoma Governor David Boren appointed Hardy in 1986 to fill a vacancy as a judge for the 15th Judicial District. This district covered Muskogee, Wagoner, Cherokee, Sequoyah and Adair Counties, the same district where his uncle had served for nearly 40 years.  Hardy served in this position for  years, until 1985, when Governor George Nigh appointed him as an associate justice of the Oklahoma Supreme Court. He served as chief justice in 1998–99. He remained on the court until retiring in 2004. Hardy spent an unspecified period of time at Hospice of Oklahoma City, where he on died September 10, 2012. A memorial service was held at First Unitarian Church of Oklahoma City.

Notes

References 

1933 births
2012 deaths
People from Muskogee, Oklahoma
University of Oklahoma alumni
Justices of the Oklahoma Supreme Court
United States Air Force Judge Advocate General's Corps
20th-century American judges